Over The Rainbow is Taiwanese Mandopop artist Angela Chang's debut Mandarin solo studio album. It was released by Linfair Records on 6 January 2004. A second edition, Over The Rainbow (Dreams Come True Edition) was released on 7 April 2004 with a bonus VCD containing five music videos.

Track listing
 "Over the Rainbow"
 "寓言" (Fable)
 "都只因為你" (Only Because of You)
 "我的最愛" (My Favorite)
 "天邊" (Horizon)
 "聽見月光" (Heard Moonlight)
 "吶喊" (Shout)
 "雨后" (After the Rain)
 "明明愛你" (Love You Obviously)
 "真愛冒險" (Adventure of True Love)
 "遺失的美好" (My Lost Happiness)
 "Journey"

Bonus VCD
Over The Rainbow (Dreams Come True Edition)
 "寓言" (Fable) MV
 "我的最愛" (My Favorite) MV
 "天邊" (Horizon) MV
 "吶喊" (Shout) MV
 "雨后" (After the Rain) MV

References

External links
  Angela Chang discography@Linfair Records

2004 debut albums
Angela Chang albums